Oleksandr Volkov (born 10 February 1961) is a former Soviet footballer and Ukrainian football manager.

External links
 
 

1961 births
Living people
Sportspeople from Mariupol
Soviet footballers
Ukrainian footballers
Association football midfielders
FC Mariupol players
FC Smena Komsomolsk-na-Amure players
FC Torpedo Zaporizhzhia players
FC Zirka Kropyvnytskyi players
FC Elektrometalurh-NZF Nikopol players
Ukrainian Premier League managers
FC Mariupol managers
FC Illichivets-2 Mariupol managers
Ukrainian Premier League players
Ukrainian football managers